Vanessa Lepage Joanisse (born 20 July 1995) is a Canadian professional boxer. For a short period of time, Joanisse was ranked 3rd in the world on Boxrec.

Early in Joanisse professional boxing career, She received a major world title fight against Mexican World Champion Alejandra Jimenez, for the World Boxing Council World Heavyweight Title. Joanisse went into this bout undefeated with three wins to her name, however she lost the bout by third-round TKO.

Professional boxing record

|-  style="text-align:center; background:#e3e3e3;"
|  style="border-style:none none solid solid; "|Res.
|  style="border-style:none none solid solid; "|Record
|  style="border-style:none none solid solid; "|Opponent
|  style="border-style:none none solid solid; "|Type
|  style="border-style:none none solid solid; "|Rd., Time
|  style="border-style:none none solid solid; "|Date
|  style="border-style:none none solid solid; "|Location
|  style="border-style:none none solid solid; "|Notes
|- align=center
|Lose
|3-1
|align=left| Alejandra Jimenez
|
|
|
|align=left|
|align=left|
|- align=center
|Win
|3-0
|align=left| Maria Jose Velis
|
|
|
|align=left|
|align=left|
|- align=center
|Win
|2-0
|align=left| Annie Mazerolle
|
|
|
|align=left|
|align=left|
|- align=center
|Win
|1-0
|align=left| Annie Mazerolle
|
|
|
|align=left|
|align=left|
|-

References

1995 births
Living people
Canadian women boxers
Heavyweight boxers